In Body and Soul (En cuerpo y alma) is a 1951 Argentine film directed by Leopoldo Torres Ríos. It stars Armando Bó, Héctor Armendáriz and Julia Sandoval.

Cast
 Armando Bo as Antonio Núñez
 Héctor Armendáriz as Pedro Guzmán
 Julia Sandoval as Margarita
 Virginia Romay as The mother
 Hugo Balado		
 Cristina Berys as Elisa
 Rolando Dumas as Andrés
 Oscar Furlong as himself	
 Omar Mendoza	as Himself
 Eduardo Moyano		
 Alberto Orián		
 Enrique Giacovino	
 Jorge Pittaluga		
 Alberto Rinaldi		
 Washington Rivera

Reception 
King opined in El Mundo: "Good realization in an emotional film. Clear in its exposition, with abundant comic notes at the beginning that later disappear to give way to the successful dramatic climate that the solution of the conflict demands". Raúl Manrupe and María Alejandra Portela in their book Un diccionario de films argentinos (1930–1995) wrote (translated from Spanish): "Loose triangle story, with the frame of a sport at the time of great popularity and trying to reedit the success of Pelota de trapo. The opening sequence with children is perfect."

References

External links
 

1951 films
1950s Spanish-language films
Argentine black-and-white films
1950s Argentine films
Films directed by Leopoldo Torres Ríos